Caged Fury is a 1989 remake of a 1983 film of the same name. It is a women-in-prison film about a group of prisoners who decide to escape from an all-female prison. The film was directed by Bill Milling, and stars Erik Estrada, Richard Barathy and James Hong.

Plot
Discontent leads to a daring escape plan in a women's prison where the inmates are all lingerie-clad models and the lesbian warden demands unusual favors for early parole.

Home Video
Caged Fury was released to DVD by MGM (owner of the 21st Century Corporation catalog)  on June 28, 2012 as a MOD DVD through MGM's Limited Edition Collection available through Amazon.  It was released on Blu-ray from Shout! Factory on May 8, 2018.

References

External links
 

1989 films
1980s exploitation films
1980s prison films
Women in prison films
American prison drama films
21st Century Film Corporation films
Films scored by Joe Delia
1980s English-language films
1980s American films